The 1995 Slamboree was the third Slamboree professional wrestling pay-per-view (PPV) event produced by World Championship Wrestling (WCW). It took place on May 21, 1995 from the Bayfront Arena in St. Petersburg, Florida. Eric Bischoff filled in on commentary for Tony Schiavone at this event; Schiavone took time off to undergo neck surgery. Wahoo McDaniel, Angelo Poffo, Terry Funk, Antonio Inoki, Dusty Rhodes, Gordon Solie and Big John Studd were inducted into the WCW Hall of Fame during the show, which also marked Solie's final appearance on a wrestling broadcast following an announcing career dating back to the 1950s. Solie had declined induction into the Hall of Fame because of the presence of Poffo, whom he considered unworthy of the honor but who was included because of the influence of his son, top WCW star Randy Savage. After being surprised on air by the induction, Solie left WCW. The event also saw the last WCW PPV for ring announcer Gary Michael Cappetta, who still appeared in TV tapings for the next month before being replaced.

As of 2014, the event is available on the WWE Network.

Storylines
The event featured professional wrestling matches that involve different wrestlers from pre-existing scripted feuds and storylines. Professional wrestlers portray villains, heroes, or less distinguishable characters in the scripted events that build tension and culminate in a wrestling match or series of matches.

Event

During the pre-show on Main Event, there were four matches. The Blue Bloods (Lord Steven Regal and Earl Robert Eaton) attacked The Nasty Boys (Brian Knobbs and Jerry Sags) by the entryway, prior to their match, in which they defeated Los Especialistas (Especialista I and Especialista II). During the next two matches, Steve Austin defeated Eddie Jackie and Sgt. Craig Pittman defeated Mark Starr.

During the final match, a quarterfinal match for the WCW United States Championship Tournament, Meng defeated Brian Pillman. Following the match, Road Warrior Hawk confronted Meng. This led to the announcement of the two men facing each other, later that night, on the pay-per-view.

In the first match of the pay-per-view, The Nasty Boys won the WCW World Tag Team Championship by defeating Harlem Heat (Booker T and Stevie Ray). Saggs began the match by himself, following the injuries Knobbs received during Main Event, before being joined by his partner. Ultimately Saggs got the pinfall, following a running powerslam on Booker T. Following the match, The Blue Bloods appears on the entry way again, staring down the new champions.

During the next match, Kevin Sullivan defeated The Man With No Name, via pinfall following the Tree of Woe. Following the match, an unknown individual appeared on the screen telling Sullivan he needed to discuss Hulkamania with him. Following this, Sullivan exited the arena through the crowd.

The "Legends match" between Wahoo McDaniel and Dick Murdoch was shown in black and white, during the pay-per-view telecast. For the match Gordon Solie joined on commentary with Bobby Heenan to further the "old school" aspects of the match.  The Great Muta then retained the IWGP Heavyweight Championship against Paul Orndorff, and Arn Anderson retained the WCW World Television Championship against Alex Wright, handing Wright his first loss. Road Warrior Hawk and Meng next ended in a double count-out, they ultimately needed to be broken up by additional referees and wrestlers from the back.

During the second to last match of the evening Sting defeated Big Bubba Rogers via submission following the Scorpion Deathlock.

The main event saw Hulk Hogan and Randy Savage defeated Ric Flair and Vader. During Hogan and Savage's entrance to the ring an unknown man can be seen standing near the entryway (later reveal to be The Giant). Hogan picked up the pinfall following Anderson accidentally hitting Flair, enabling Hogan to do a leg drop on Flair. After the match, Flair, Vader and Anderson continued to attack Hogan and Savage, leading to Savage’s father Angelo Poffo to jump the guardrail from ringside to come to his son’s rescue. Flair however was able to get the figure-4 leglock on Poffo, before Hogan and The Renegade were able to get Flair, Anderson and Vader out of the ring.

Results

References

Professional wrestling in St. Petersburg, Florida
1995 in Florida
Events in St. Petersburg, Florida
1995
May 1995 events in the United States
1995 World Championship Wrestling pay-per-view events